The 2004–05 season was Hartlepool United's 96th year in existence and their second consecutive season in League One. Along with competing in League One, the club also participated in the FA Cup, League Cup and League Trophy. The season covers the period from 1 July 2004 to 30 June 2005.

Players

Current squad

Transfers

Transfers in

Loans in

Transfers out

Loans out

Results

Pre-season friendlies

League One

Results summary

Results by matchday

Results

Play-Offs

FA Cup

League Cup

Football League Trophy

Squad statistics

Appearances and goals

|}

Goalscorers

Clean Sheets

Penalties

Suspensions

References

Hartlepool United
Hartlepool United F.C. seasons
2000s in County Durham